Remer  may refer to:

People
 Carola Remer (born 1991), German model
 John Remer (1883–1948), British politician
 Otto Ernst Remer (1912–1997), Nazi officer
 Richard Remer (1883–1973), American athlete
 Tim Remer (born 1985), Dutch handball player
 Willi Remer (1908–unknown), German modern pentathlete

Other uses
 Remèr, a Venetian craftsman of traditional rowlocks and oars
 Remer, Minnesota, a small city in the United States
 Remer Township, Cass County, Minnesota, in the United States

See also

Reimer, a name
Riemer, a name
Reimers, a name
 Terra Lawson-Remer (born 1978), American politician